Gordon Melville Smith (3 July 1954 – 5 April 2014) was a Scottish professional footballer who played as a full back.

Career
Born in Partick, he played for the amateur clubs Rangers B.C. and Glasgow United before turning professional with St Johnstone, at which time he was a forward before switching to a defensive role. He also played in England  for Aston Villa, Tottenham Hotspur and Wolverhampton Wanderers, and in the United States for Pittsburgh Spirit. While at Aston Villa, Smith helped them win the 1976–77 Football League Cup, in the final of which he featured as a substitute in the second and decisive replay. 

While with St Johnstone he gained four Scottish under-23 caps.

Personal life and death
After his playing career, Smith ran a business which installed the special perimeter hoardings used in UEFA Champions League stadia.

He died on 5 April 2014 from natural causes. His grandfather Willie Salisbury was also a footballer, primarily for Partick Thistle.

References

External links
St Johnstone FC obituary

1954 births
2014 deaths
Scottish footballers
Association football fullbacks
St Johnstone F.C. players
Aston Villa F.C. players
Tottenham Hotspur F.C. players
Wolverhampton Wanderers F.C. players
Scottish Football League players
English Football League players
Major Indoor Soccer League (1978–1992) players
Scotland youth international footballers
Scotland under-23 international footballers
Scottish expatriate footballers
Scottish expatriate sportspeople in the United States
Expatriate soccer players in the United States
Phoenix Inferno players
Pittsburgh Spirit players
People from Partick
Footballers from Glasgow